Merope was a cluster composed of repurposed Intel Xeon X5670 (Westmere) processors that were once part of the Pleiades supercomputer. The system is used both for running real-world computational jobs for NASA scientists and engineers and for testing purposes. Housed in an auxiliary processing center located about 1 kilometer from the NAS facility at NASA Ames Research Center.

Merope (pronounced MEH-reh-pee) is named after one of the seven stars that make up the Pleiades open star cluster in the constellation Taurus.

References 

attribution This article contains text from the public domain source https://www.nas.nasa.gov/hecc/resources/merope.html

NASA supercomputers
SGI supercomputers